Arthur Torrell Anderson (July 1, 1916 – April 4, 1983) was an American professional basketball player. He played for the Akron Goodyear Wingfoots in the National Basketball League and averaged 0.7 points per game. In 1979, he was elected to the Athletic Hall of Honor at Augustana College, where he was captain of the basketball team.

Biography
Anderson served in the United States army from November 16, 1942, to September 17, 1943, where he played on the Fort Sheridan, Illinois basketball team. After playing professional basketball, he joined the accounting department of Republic Steel in Chicago, Illinois.

References

1916 births
1983 deaths
Akron Goodyear Wingfoots players
Amateur Athletic Union men's basketball players
American men's basketball players
American military sports players
Augustana (Illinois) Vikings men's basketball players
Basketball players from Illinois
Centers (basketball)
Basketball players from Chicago
United States Army soldiers
United States Army personnel of World War II